Nathaniel Pitt Langford (August 9, 1832 – October 18, 1911) was an American explorer, businessman, bureaucrat, vigilante and historian from Saint Paul, Minnesota who played an important role in the early years of the Montana gold fields, territorial government and the creation of Yellowstone National Park.

Early life
Langford was born in Upstate New York and moved to Saint Paul in 1854. He worked as a banker and was involved with the investment of the Saint Anthony Park neighborhood.

Montana gold fields
On June 16, 1862, Langford, as a member and officer of the Northern Overland Expedition, commanded by Captain James L. Fisk, left Saint Paul to establish a wagon road to the Salmon river mine regions of the Rocky Mountains via Fort Benton.  The expedition ended up at the Grasshopper Creek gold fields in the area soon to be named Bannack, Montana.  There Langford and his fellow businessmen established freight companies, a saw mill and other businesses.

Vigilante
Langford was also part of the vigilante movement, the infamous Montana Vigilantes, that dealt with lawlessness in Virginia City and Bannack, Montana during 1863–64.

In 1890, Langford wrote Vigilante Days and Ways to chronicle the era of pioneer justice in the American Old West.

Territorial tax collector
In 1864, shortly after the Montana Territory was established on May 28, 1864, Langford was appointed Collector of Internal Revenue and National Bank Examiner, positions he held for five years in the Montana Territorial government.

Yellowstone exploration and creation

Langford was a member of the 1870 Washburn–Langford–Doane Expedition which explored portions of the region that soon would become the Yellowstone National Park.

After his participation in the Washburn expedition, Langford was appointed as the first superintendent of the park. He soon got the nickname National Park Langford because of his initials N.P. There was no money available to offer him a salary for this new position, so he had to make his living elsewhere. This left Langford with little time to run the park, and he entered it only twice during his five years as superintendent. The first time was as a guest on the second Hayden Expedition in 1872, and his second took place in 1874 to evict a man named Matthew McGuirk. McGuirk claimed to own the Boiling River – one of the park's hot springs rumored to have healing powers.

Langford had no salary, no funding for the park, and no legal way to enforce protection for its wildlife and geologic features. Political pressure, which took the guise of accusing Langford of neglect, forced the removal of Yellowstone's first superintendent in 1877. He was replaced by Philetus W. Norris. In 1905, Langford published Diary of the Washburn Expedition to the Yellowstone and Firehole In the Year 1870 as a comprehensive insider's view of the expedition.

Historian

After his Yellowstone experiences, Langford returned to his home state of Minnesota and began a career as a Western historian. Prior to his passing he served as the president of and on the board of directors of the Minnesota Historical Society.

Notes

References
Initial text adapted from

Further reading
Correspondence, diaries, genealogical data, clippings, and other papers relating to Nathaniel Pitt Langford and his family are available for research use: Nathinal Pitt Langford and Family: An Inventory of Their Papers.
Included is data regarding the family's life in New York before migrating to the Lake Pepin area of Minnesota in 1854; on numerous aspects of life in Minnesota Territory (1854–1857); and on Nathaniel's career as Montana collector of internal revenue and on lawlessness and vigilante activity there (1863–1869).

External links
 
 
 

1832 births
1911 deaths
Yellowstone National Park
19th-century explorers
Businesspeople from Saint Paul, Minnesota
People of the American Old West
Montana pioneers
Historians from Minnesota
19th-century American businesspeople